The 1980–81 Fort Lauderdale Strikers season was the second season of the team in the North American Soccer League indoor league.  It was part of the club's fourteenth season in professional soccer.  This year the team finished in fourth place of the Eastern Division and did not make the playoffs.  Following this season, the team sat out the 1981–82 NASL Indoor season, and returned in the 1983 NASL Grand Prix of Indoor Soccer.

Background

Review

Competitions

NASL indoor regular season 

W = Wins, L = Losses, GB = Games Behind 1st Place, % = Winning Percentage, GF = Goals For, GA = Goals Against

Results summaries

Results by round

Match reports

NASL indoor playoffs 

did not qualify

Statistics

Transfers

References 

Fort Lauderdale Strikers (1977–1983) seasons
Fort Lauderdale Strikers
Fort Lauderdale Strikers indoor
Fort Lauderdale Strikers indoor
Fort Lauderdale Strikers